Adaina invida is a moth of the family Pterophoridae. It is found in Brazil (São Paulo), Costa Rica and Panama.

The wingspan is 12–13 mm. The thorax is pale brown and the tegulae, mesothorax and abdomen are pale ochreous-brown. The forewings are pale straw-yellow with brown markings and grey-brown fringes. The underside is pale brown. The hindwings and fringes are brown-grey and the underside is pale brown. Adults have been recorded in February, July and October.

The larvae feed on Senecio brasiliensis.

References

Moths described in 1908
Oidaematophorini